Paulo César da Silva Argolo (born 27 March 1986), commonly known as Paulo César, is a professional footballer who currently plays as a goalkeeper for Hong Kong Premier League club Kitchee. Born in Brazil, he plays for the Hong Kong national team.

Club career
In July 2016, Paulo joined Tai Po.

Paulo finally earned his first start for Kitchee in which he made his first appearance against Southern in the HKPL on 10 May 2021.

He became the first choice goalkeeper in Kitchee’s ACL group stage due to the absence of Wang Zhenpeng, He played his first ACL match on 24 June 2021, beating Thai Port 2-0.

International career
On 10 May 2021, Paulo officially announced that he had received a Hong Kong passport, making him eligible to represent Hong Kong internationally.

On 1 June 2022, Paulo made his international debut for Hong Kong in the friendly match against Malaysia.

Career statistics

Club

Notes

References

External links
 
 Paulo César da Silva Argolo at HKFA

1986 births
Living people
People from Aracaju
Brazilian emigrants to Hong Kong
Naturalized footballers of Hong Kong
Hong Kong footballers
Hong Kong international footballers
Brazilian footballers
Brazilian expatriate footballers
Association football goalkeepers
Esporte Clube Bahia players
Alagoinhas Atlético Clube players
Colo Colo de Futebol e Regatas players
Agremiação Sportiva Arapiraquense players
Crato Esporte Clube players
C.F. Os Belenenses players
Esporte Clube Novo Hamburgo players
Eastern Sports Club footballers
Citizen AA players
Hong Kong Rangers FC players
Tai Po FC players
Kitchee SC players
Hoi King SA players
Campeonato Brasileiro Série B players
Hong Kong Premier League players
Hong Kong First Division League players
Brazilian expatriate sportspeople in Portugal
Brazilian expatriate sportspeople in Hong Kong
Expatriate footballers in Portugal
Expatriate footballers in Hong Kong
Hong Kong League XI representative players
Sportspeople from Sergipe